Halistylus genecoani is a species of sea snail, a marine gastropod mollusk in the family Trochidae, the top snails.

Distribution
This species occurs in the Pacific Ocean off Baja California, Mexico.

References

External links
 To World Register of Marine Species

genecoani
Gastropods described in 1984